Thomas Dutton may refer to:

Thomas Dutton (1421–1459), medieval English knight
Thomas Goldsworthy Dutton (1820–1891), English marine lithographer
Thomas Dutton (physician) (1854–1935), British dietitian and physician